The marozi or "spotted lion" is variously claimed by zoologists to be a distinct race of the lion adapted for a montane rather than savanna-dwelling existence, a rare natural hybrid of a lion and a leopard, lion and a jaguar, or an adult lion that retained its childhood spots. It is believed to have been smaller than a lion, but slightly larger in size than a leopard and lacking any distinguishable mane. It has been reported in the wild and the skin of a specimen exists, but it has yet to be confirmed as either a separate species or subspecies.

Discovery

The unusual spotted markings on what seemed to be smallish adult lions prompted interest from the Nairobi Game Department; they were from pubescent lions and yet had prominent spots that are typical only of cubs.

Gandar-Dower's expedition

Two years later, explorer Kenneth Gandar-Dower headed an expedition into the region in an attempt to capture or kill more specimens. He returned with only circumstantial evidence: three sets of tracks found at a similar elevation as Trent's lions. They were believed to have been left by individuals that were tracking a herd of buffalo during a hunt, ruling out the possibility of the marozi being cubs. Dower also discovered that the natives had long differentiated the marozi from lions or leopards, which they referred to by different names. Aside from that, he found out that the marozi had also been called different names in other regions, such as "ntararago" in Uganda, "ikimizi" in Rwanda, and "abasambo" in Ethiopia. R. I. Pocock examined a skin and skull collected by Michael Trent, and discussed his findings in an appendix to Gandar-Dower's book, but he could not reach definite conclusions on the limited evidence available.

There were other sightings around the same time:
They were shot at, but escaped.

In 1963, zoologist Charles Albert Walter Guggisberg claimed that there is no reliable evidence for the marozi, despite the existence of the skin pictured above, saying "to this day nobody has been able to produce any proof of its existence".

See also
Leopon
Lipard

References

 Gandar-Dower, Kenneth; The Spotted Lion (1937)
 McGuinness, C.J.; Nomad (1934)
 Foran, Major W. Robert;  "The Legendary Spotted Lion" (1950; published in The Field)
 Hamilton-Snowball, G.; letter to The Field (1948)
 Pollard, J.R.T.; letter to The Field (1948)

Extinct carnivorans
Panthera hybrids
Purported mammals
Subspecies